Nami Mun is a Korean American novelist and short story writer.

Life
Nami Mun was born in Seoul, South Korea, though she grew up in The Bronx.
She graduated from University of California, Berkeley, and from the University of Michigan, with an MFA.

Her stories have been published in Granta, Pushcart Prize Anthology, The Iowa Review, Evergreen Review, Witness, Bat City Review, and Tin House.

Awards
 2012 Chicago Public Library  21st Century Award
 2009 Orange Prize finalist
 2009 Whiting Award

Works

Books

Short Stories
 (Subscription Required)

References

External links
Profile at The Whiting Foundation
"Miles from Nowhere website"
"Interview: Nami Mun", Chicagoist
"Interview: novelist Nami Mun", San Francisco metblogs
"Nami Mun revisits being homeless", Minnesota Public Radio, Euan Kerr, January 15, 2009

21st-century American novelists
American women novelists
American writers of Korean descent
People from Seoul
Living people
American novelists of Asian descent
University of Michigan alumni
21st-century American women writers
Year of birth missing (living people)